Yannick Bolloré (born 1 February 1980) is a French businessman, currently the chairman and chief executive officer (CEO) of Havas, the fifth largest global communications company, and chairman of the supervisory board of Vivendi, a global entertainment, media and communications company whose majority shareholder is the family-controlled Bolloré Group chaired by his brother Cyrille Bolloré.

Career

Having begun a DESS (French university degree) in audio-visual communication, in 2002 Bolloré founded film production company WY Productions, whose films include Hell, Yves Saint-Laurent, Des vents contraires and Amitiés sincères, together with Wassim Béji, nephew of French-Tunisian producer Tarak Ben Ammar.

In July 2006, he joined Bolloré Group chaired by his father Vincent, as programs director of Direct 8. The TV channel achieved the highest audience growth of any French television channel at the time thanks to the broadcast of the matches of the French women's football team and the creation of the popular Touche pas à mon poste! program presented by Cyril Hanouna. From September 2009 to September 2010, he was CEO of Bolloré Média, which includes TV channel Direct 8, the freesheets Direct Matin (largest daily paper in France with over one million circulation) and Direct Soir, the Bolloré Intermédia advertising network, and opinion pollster CSA. In March 2010, he purchased the Virgin 17 television channel from Lagardère and in September relaunched it under a new brand Direct Star. Between October 2009 and June 2010, he founded several companies including Havas Productions,  and Direct Cinéma, a joint film production company.

Yannick Bolloré was appointed vice-president of Havas in March 2011. In September 2011, he signed a deal to sell the television business of Bolloré Média, which had become the no. 3 private radio and TV broadcaster in France, to Canal+ Group for close to €465 million in exchange for Vivendi shares, which makes Bolloré Group the largest Vivendi shareholder.

He was appointed chairman and CEO of the Havas Group in August 2013. In July 2017, the Vivendi group acquired Bolloré Group's majority stake in Havas. In 2019, Havas Group reported revenue of €2,3778 million.

Yannick Bolloré has been a director of Bolloré Participations since 1998, Bolloré since 2009, Havas since 2010 and the Rodin Museum since 2015. He has been a member of the influential club Le Siècle.

Personal life
In June 2006, Yannick Bolloré married Chloé Bouygues, niece of Martin Bouygues. He is the father of four daughters.

Awards and honours
Young Global Leader at the World Economic Forum (since 2008)
B'nai Brith Gold Medal, for having “illustrated and defended the individual and universal values of ethics and philosophical and religious morals” (2010)
Chevalier de l'Ordre des arts et lettres de la République française (Knight of the Order of Arts and Letters of the French Republic) (2012)

References 

1980 births
Living people
French advertising executives
French chief executives
Paris Dauphine University alumni
Saint-Jean de Passy alumni
Chevaliers of the Ordre des Arts et des Lettres